WGWD-LP (98.3 FM) is an American non-commercial religious radio station licensed by the Federal Communications Commission to serve the community of Paintsville, Kentucky. The station license is assigned to Paintsville Church of Christ. WGWD-LP airs a Christian radio format.

The station has held the WGWD-LP callsign since October 14, 2014.

References

External links
  Official WGWD-LP Website
 FCC Public Inspection File for WGWD-LP
 

GWD-LP
Radio stations established in 2015
2015 establishments in Kentucky
Paintsville, Kentucky
GWD-LP